Luciana may refer to:

 Luciana (given name), a Latin feminine given name
 Luciana (singer), British pop singer
 Luciana, Ciudad Real, a small village and municipality in Spain
 Luciana (album), by Juno Reactor